Gilad Bloom (born 1 March 1967) is a former professional tennis player from Israel. Bloom trained at the Israel Tennis Centers. His career-high rankings were World No. 61 in singles (in 1990) and World No. 62 in doubles (in 1992).

Personal life
Bloom grew up in Ramat HaSharon, is Jewish, and is married to Michal Bareket-Bloom. He has 4 sons, Guy Tyler Bloom, from a previous marriage, Jonathan Yehuda Bloom, Shy Dylan Bloom and Doron Hendrix Bloom (from his second marriage). He is known as a fan of the Hapoel Tel Aviv soccer team. Bloom has a rock band (The Gilad Bloom Band), the band plays shows in Manhattan Bars regularly since 2009, Bloom's band performs original songs written and composed by himself, Bloom sings and plays guitar on the band.

Tennis career
Bloom was Israel's junior champion, three-time men's singles champion, and two-time men's doubles champion. Bloom came in second in the boy's under-12 final at the annual Ericsson Orange Bowl International Tennis Championships in 1979.

Bloom turned professional in 1983 and played on the ATP tour for 13 years. During his career he won four tour doubles titles (at Tel Aviv and São Paulo in 1987, and at Seoul and Umag in 1991). He also finished runner-up in three top-level singles events (Tel Aviv in 1989, Manchester in 1990, and Singapore in 1991).

Bloom played Davis Cup for Israel from 1984 to 1995. He helped Israel qualify to the 1994 Davis Cup World Group, winning the qualification playoff's fifth and deciding rubber against Switzerland's Jakob Hlasek in one of the more memorable matches in Israeli tennis history.

His best singles performance at a Grand Slam was at the 1990 US Open, where he reached the fourth round, losing to Ivan Lendl.

Bloom represented Israel at the 1988 and 1992 Olympic tennis tournaments.

He retired from the professional tour in 1995.

Career finals

Singles (3 runners-up)

Doubles (4 titles, 1 runner-up)

Coaching career

Since retiring from the tour, Bloom has played in seniors events and worked as a tennis coach and Director of Tennis.

In 1995 he was senior coach with the Israel Tennis Centers, coaching the country's top juniors among them Dudi Sela.

Since moving to NYC in 2000 Bloom had his own tennis program (Gilad Bloom Tennis) for 9 years and was also the first Director of Tennis at The John McEnroe Tennis Academy in Randall's Island, NY (2010–12). After leaving the McEnroe Academy Bloom worked as the Executive Director of Tennis at TCR (The Club of Riverdale) in Riverdale, NY (2012–15). Bloom is currently back to running his own tennis program (Gilad Bloom Tennis) in NYC.

See also
List of select Jewish tennis players

References

External links 
 
 
 
 New York Tennis Club bio
 "Tenniswise Tips: The Obvious and Beyond", Spring 2003, by Gilad Bloom
 Gilad Bloom Tennis Program official website

Israeli male tennis players
Olympic tennis players of Israel
Tennis players at the 1988 Summer Olympics
Tennis players at the 1992 Summer Olympics
Israeli tennis coaches
1967 births
Living people
Jewish tennis players
Sportspeople from Tel Aviv